Gerard de Furnival (c.1175–1219) was a Norman knight and Lord of Hallamshire (now part of Sheffield, England) and Worksop. De Furnival's father was also called Gerard de Furnival, and had fought with Richard I at the Siege of Acre.

De Furnival was married to Maud, the great-granddaughter of William de Lovetot, and it was by this marriage that the lordships of Hallamshire and Worksop came into the Furnival family. However, this inheritance was not without competition, as although the eldest branch of De Lovetot ended in a female heiress, there was another branch still existing, which sprang from the William de Lovetot, by his younger son Nigel. With the death of Maud's father (also called William de Lovetot), the rights of this branch were vested in Maud's cousin, Richard de Lovetot,  who seems to have acquiesced in the transit of the great property of the family to Maud, her husband, Gerard de Furnival, and her issue.

During the Fifth Crusade De Furnival travelled to Damietta (Egypt), where he died in 1219. He was succeeded by his son, Thomas de Furnival, who died alongside his brother Gerard in the Holy Land while on the Barons' Crusade in 1241.
Furnival Gate in Sheffield is named after Gerard.

See also
 History of Sheffield
 Timeline of Sheffield history

References

 White, Robert (1875) Worksop, The Dukery, and Sherwood Forest. Transcription at Nicholson, AP: ''Nottinghamshire History (accessed 28 January 2006).

1170s births
1219 deaths
Anglo-Normans
Norman warriors
People from Sheffield